David Hitchcock is an English cartoonist known mainly for his small press comics work – particularly his book Springheeled Jack, for which he won an Eagle Award in 2006.

Biography

Hitchcock wrote the 48-page one-shot Whitechapel Freak and the three-issue mini-series Springheeled Jack, both available from Full Circle Publications.

He has also worked with writers Leah Moore and John Reppion, on various short stories for Accent comics.

Recent projects include Gothic, a collection of short stories, some original and some previously published. He is also working on a short story for Boom! Studios' Cthulhu Tales with Shane Oakley. He is currently illustrating a two-volume graphic novel called Madam Samurai, with screenwriter Gary Young, whose credits include the film Harry Brown starring Michael Caine.

Bibliography
Comics work includes:

Spirit of the Highwayman
 Whitechapel Freak (original tabloid newsprint edition −2002)
Whitechapel Freak: Who Was The Fiend Called Jack The Ripper (Full Circle Publications, 2004)
Springheeled Jack (3-issue mini-series, Full Circle)
Accent Anthologies (art, with Leah Moore and John Reppion):
 "Lusca" (in Monsters, 2006)
 "An Molethy a an Ny-marrow (The Curse of the Un-dead)" (in Zombies, 2007)
 "Mrs. Henry" (in Western, 2009)
 Gothic (newspaper size collection of stories, 2008)
 "a whistle for the deep" (art, with writer Shane Oakley, in Cthulhu Tales No. 12, Boom! Studios, March 2009)
 Madam Samurai Books 1 and 2 (art, with writer Gary Young, 2-volume graphic novel series, Scar Comics, 2010)
 A Mother's Love (16-page short horror story, art only) for SPLIT LIP COMICS.
 The Sixpenny Murder – written by John A. Short – Kult Kreations. A gruesome true account of a class killing in Victorian Liverpool. Just for the sake of sixpence. The comic strip format was originally produced as part of a program to aid underprivileged teens.
 Paradise Mechanism – written and drawn by David Hitchcock, plot by Kerry Hitchcock. Coloured by Matthew Soffe. For David Lloyd's ACES WEEKLY digital comic—2012

Awards

2005 won the "Favourite Black & White Comic Book – British" Eagle Award for Springheeled Jack

Notes

References

 David Hitchcock at Barney

External links

 Black Boar Blogger
Madam Samurai.com

Interviews

 Springheeled Jack Leaps Again!, Sequential Tart, July 2003

Living people
English comics writers
English comics artists
Year of birth missing (living people)